Survival is a South Korean manhwa series. The Korean comic book series has been translated and have sold more than 28 million copies worldwide.

References

Manhwa titles
Books about survival skills